This is a List of lakes of Madagascar.

A
Lake Andraikiba -
Lake Alaotra - Lake Anosy

I
Itasy lake -
Lake Ihotry

K

Lake Kinkony

M
Manjakatompo Lake -
Lake Mandraka - Lake Mantasoa

R
Lake Ravelobe

T

Lake Tritriva - Lake Tsimanampetsotsa

Madagascar